Victor Kravchenko may refer to:

 Victor Kravchenko (defector) (1905–1966), Soviet defector
 Viktor Kravchenko (athlete) (born 1941), Soviet athlete